3Delight, also known as 3DelightNSI, is 3D computer graphics software that runs on Microsoft Windows, MacOS and Linux. It is developed by Illumination Research. It is both a photorealistic and NPR path tracing offline renderer based on its NSI API and on OSL. It has been used to render full CGI animation and VFX for numerous feature films, including Chappie. It comes with supported, open source plug-in integrations for several DCC applications, such as Maya, Houdini, Cinema4D, Katana, and a democratic free license that allows for commercial use. It also provides a fully distributed cloud rendering service called 3Delight Cloud.

History
Work on 3Delight started in 1999. The renderer became first publicly available in 2000. 3Delight was the first RenderMan-compliant renderer combining the REYES algorithm with on-demand ray tracing.

The 3Delight team decided to make it available free of charge from August 2000 to March 2005 to build a user base. During this time, customers using a large number of licenses on their sites or requiring extensive support were asked provide fiscal compensation for this.

In March 2005, the license was changed. The first license was free and subsequent licenses cost 1,000 USD per two thread node and US$1,500 per four thread node. The first company that licensed 3Delight commercially was Rising Sun Pictures in early 2005.

Since 2018, all purchased licenses are unlimited multi-core. The first license is free; initially limited to four cores and later increased to eight and now 12.

As of 2018, Illumination Research introduced a new interface, the Nodal Scene Interface (NSI), to replace the old RenderMan one, and updated the name of the renderer to 3DelightNSI.

Features
Until version 10 (2013), 3Delight primarily used the REYES algorithm but was also capable of doing ray tracing and global illumination. As of version 11 (2014), 3Delight primarily uses Path Tracing, with the option to use the REYES and RayTracing when needed. The renderer is fully multi-threaded, supports RenderMan Shading Language (RSL) 1.0/2.0 with optimising compiler and last stage JIT compilation. 3Delight also supports distributed rendering. This allows for accelerated rendering on multi-CPU hosts or environments where a large number of computers are joined into a grid / cloud.

It implements all required capabilities for a RenderMan-compliant renderer and also the following optional ones:
Area light sources
Depth of field
Displacement mapping
Environment mapping
Global illumination
Level of detail
Motion blur
Programmable shading
Special camera projections (through the "ray trace hider")
Ray tracing
Shadow depth mapping
Solid modeling
Texture mapping
Volume shading

3Delight also supports the following capabilities, which are not part of any capabilities list:
Photon mapping
Point clouds
Hierarchical subdivision surfaces
NURB curves
Brick maps (three-dimensional, mip-mapped textures)
(RIB) Conditionals
Class-based shaders
Co-shaders

Other features include:

Extended display subset functionality to allow rendering of geometric primitives, writing to the same display variable, to different images.For example, display subsets could be used to render the skin and fur of a creature to two separate images at once without the fur matting the skin passes.
Memory efficient point clouds. Like brick maps, point clouds are organized in a spatial data structure and are loaded lazily, keeping the memory requirements as low as possible.
Procedural geometry is instanced lazily even during ray tracing, keeping the memory requirements as low as possible.
Displacement shaders can be stacked.
Displacement shaders can (additionally) be run on the vertices of a geometric primitive, before that primitive is even shaded.
The gather() shadeop can be used on point clouds and to generate sample distributions from (high dynamic range) images, e.g. for easily combining photon mapping with image-based lighting.
First order ray differentials on any ray fired from within a shader.
A read/write disk cache that allows the renderer to take strain off the network, when heavy scene data needs to be repeatedly distributed to clients on a render farm or image data sent back from such clients to a central storage server.
A C API that allows running RenderMan Shading Language (RSL) code on arbitrary data, e.g. inside a modelling application.

Supported platforms
Apple Mac OS X on the PowerPC and x86 architectures (The last version to support PPC architecture was version 9. All versions from 10 up are Intel x86 only and will not run on PowerPC Macs.)
Linux on the x86, x86-64 and Cell architectures
Microsoft Windows on the x86 and x86-64 architectures

Operating environments
The renderer comes in both 32-bit and 64-bit versions. The latter allowing the processing of very large scene datasets.

Discontinued platforms
Platforms supported in the past included:
Digital Equipment Corporation Digital UNIX on the Alpha architecture
Silicon Graphics IRIX on the MIPS architecture (might still be supported, on request)
Sun Microsystems Solaris on the SPARC architecture

Film credits
3Delight has been used for visual effects work on many films. Some notable examples are:
Assault on Precinct 13
Bailey's Billion$
Black Christmas
Blades of Glory
The Blood Diamond
Charlotte's Web
 CJ7 / Cheung Gong 7 hou
The Chronicles of Narnia: The Lion, the Witch and the Wardrobe
The Chronicles of Riddick
Cube Zero
District 9
Fantastic Four
Fantastic Four: Rise of the Silver Surfer
Final Destination 3
Harry Potter and the Half-Blood Prince
Harry Potter and the Order of the Phoenix
Hulk
The Incredible Hulk
The Last Mimzy
The Ruins
The Seeker: The Dark is Rising
Terminator Salvation
Superman Returns
The Woods
X-Men: The Last Stand
X-Men Origins: Wolverine
It was also used to render the following full CG features:
Adventures in Animation (Imax 3D featurette)
Happy Feet Two
Free Jimmy

References

External links
3Delight home page
Rodmena Network

3D graphics software
RenderMan
Proprietary commercial software for Linux